The United States House of Representatives has had 157 elected African-American members, of whom 151 have been representatives from U.S. states and 6 have been delegates from U.S. territories and the District of Columbia. The House of Representatives is the lower house of the bicameral United States Congress, which is the legislative branch of the federal government of the United States.

According to the U.S. Census Bureau, the term "African American" includes all individuals who identify with one or more nationalities or ethnic groups originating in any of the black racial groups of Africa. The term is generally used for Americans with at least partial ancestry in any of the original peoples of sub-Saharan Africa. During the founding of the federal government, African Americans were consigned to a status of second-class citizenship or enslaved. No African American served in federal elective office before the ratification in 1870 of the Fifteenth Amendment to the United States Constitution. The Fifteenth Amendment prohibits the federal and state governments from denying any citizen the right to vote because of that citizen's race, color, or previous condition of servitude.

Joseph Rainey was the first African-American representative to be seated in the U.S. House. He served South Carolina's 1st congressional district beginning in 1870 during the Reconstruction era following the American Civil War. The first African-American woman to serve as a representative was Shirley Chisholm from New York's 12th congressional district in 1969 during the Civil Rights Movement.

Many African-American members of the House of Representatives serve majority-minority districts. Some of these congressional districts are gerrymandered, limiting serious challenges to their re-election, and limiting their abilities to represent a larger, more diverse constituency.  The Voting Rights Act of 1965 includes restrictions on the ability of States to diminish minority representation during redistricting.  In the elections of 2016 and 2018, an increasing number of non-majority-minority districts have elected racial minority representatives.

Overall, 30 of the 50 U.S. states, plus the U.S. Virgin Islands and the District of Columbia, have elected an African American to represent them in the U.S. House of Representatives, with Washington being the most recent to elect their first (in 2020); out of these, 23 states, plus the U.S. Virgin Islands and the District of Columbia, have elected an African-American woman to represent them in the U.S. House. Illinois's 1st congressional district has the longest continuous streak of electing African-American representatives, a tendency that has occurred from 1928 to the present. There currently are 58 African-American representatives and two African-American delegates in the United States House of Representatives, representing 28 states, plus the U.S. Virgin Islands and the District of Columbia. Most are members of the Congressional Black Caucus.

List of states represented by African Americans

Reconstruction and early post-Reconstruction era, 1870–1887
Political party

Late post-Reconstruction, Populist, and early Jim Crow era, 1887–1929
Political party

Late Jim Crow and Civil Rights era, 1929–1970
Political parties

Modern era, 1971–present

Representatives
Political parties

House delegates (non-voting members)
Political parties

African Americans elected to the House of Representatives, but not seated

Political party

See also

Federal government

African Americans in the United States Congress
List of African-American United States senators
Congressional Black Caucus
Congressional Black Caucus Foundation
List of African-American United States Cabinet members

State and local government
African-American officeholders in the United States, 1789–1866
List of African-American U.S. state firsts
List of first African-American mayors

Notes

References

Further reading

  The website, Black Americans in Congress maintained by the Clerk of the United States House of Representatives, serves as an ongoing supplement to the book. To download a free copy of the entire publication or a specific portion of the publication, see H. Doc. 108-224 - Black Americans in Congress 1870 - 2007. Made available by the United States Government Printing Office (GPO).

External links
African American Members of the United States Congress: 1870–2018 A 51-page history produced by the Congressional Research Service, a legislative branch agency within the Library of Congress.
Biographical Directory of the United States Congress, 1774–present Perform search of desired representative or delegate by last name, first name, position, state, party, by year or congress.
C-SPAN videos that discuss the history of African Americans in Congress:
Black Americans in Congress, 1870–2007 A C-SPAN video with Matthew Wasniewski, historian of the United States House of Representatives, as the presenter. He discusses the history of African Americans in Congress from 1870 to 2007. The video is 164 minutes in length.
African Americans in Congress in the 19th Century A C-SPAN video with Matthew Wasniewski and Farar Elliott, historian and curator respectively of the United States House of Representatives, as the presenters. They discuss the history of African Americans in Congress during the nineteenth century. The video is 28:54 minutes in length.
African Americans in Congress in the 20th Century A C-SPAN video with Ron Dellums, the former representative of the United States House of Representatives from California's 9th congressional district, and Matthew Wasniewski and Farar Elliott, historian and curator respectively of the United States House of Representatives, as the presenters. They discuss the history of African Americans in Congress during the twentieth century. The video is 43:59 minutes in length.
Black Americans in Congress Maintained by the Clerk of the United States House of Representatives. The website serves as an ongoing supplement to the book, Black Americans in Congress, 1870–2007.
Major African American Office Holders Since 1641 Includes a listing for the United States Senate. Maintained by Blackpast.org.

Political history of the United States
Lists of African-American people
African-American